Gurdwara Sis Ganj Sahib is one of the nine historical Gurdwaras in Delhi. It was first constructed in 1783 as a small shrine by Baghel Singh to commemorate the martyrdom site of the ninth Sikh Guru, Guru Tegh Bahadur and was probably expanded after Indian Rebellion of 1857 or after Partition of India. Before its construction the Mughal Kotwali (Police Station and Jail) was situated here. After the Indian Rebellion of 1857 the Mughal Kotwali was demolished by the British.and the land was given to the Sikhs because the Sikh Maharaja of Patiala and other Sikh soldiers helped the British to defeat the Mughal soldiers by providing large numbers of ammunition and soldiers. Its current building was made by Rai Bahadur Narain Singh a contractor who build most of roads in Lutyens New Delhi construction under British Rule. Situated in Chandni Chowk in Old Delhi, it marks the site where the ninth Sikh Guru was beheaded on the orders of the Mughal emperor Aurangzeb on 11 November 1675. The Sikh regiment of the Indian army salute the Sis Ganj Gurudwara before saluting the president of India since 1979, the only instance of saluting twice in the Republic Day parade by a regiment of Indian army.

History

The ninth Sikh Guru, Guru Tegh Bahadur was beheaded here on 24 November 1675 on the orders of the Mughal Emperor Aurangzeb. However, before their body could be quartered and exposed to public view, it was stolen under the cover of darkness by one of his disciples, Lakhi Shah Vanjara who, then burnt his house to cremate Guru's body; today, at this site stands Gurdwara Rakab Ganj Sahib.

The trunk of the tree beneath which the head of the Guru was severed and the well used by him for taking bath during his prison term have been preserved in the shrine. Also, adjoining the gurudwara, stands the Kotwali (police station), where Guru was imprisoned and his disciples were tortured. Located close to it is the Sunehri Masjid (Chandni Chowk).

On 11 March 1783, Sikh military leader Baghel Singh (1730–1802) marched into Delhi along with his army. He occupied the Diwan-i-Am, the Mughal emperor Shah Alam II made a settlement with them agreeing to allow Baghel Singh to raise gurudwaras on Sikh historical sites in the city and receive six annas in a rupee (37.5%) of all the octroi duties in the capital. Sis Ganj was one of the shrines built by him, within the time span of eight months, from April to November 1783. However, due to volatile political climate in the coming century, the site alternated between being a mosque and a gurudwara. It became a site of dispute between two communities, and litigation followed. Eventually, after prolonged ligation the Privy Council during British Raj ruled in the favour of the Sikh litigants and the present structure was added in 1930; gold gild of the domes was added in the coming years. The Mughal-era Kotwali was handed over to the Delhi Sikh Gurdwara Management Committee around 1971.

The severed head ("Sis" in Hindi or Punjabi) of Guru Tegh Bahadur was brought to Anandpur Sahib by Bhai Jaita, another disciple of the Guru. Another gurudwara by the same name, Gurudwara Sisganj Sahib at Anandpur Sahib in Punjab, marks this site, where, in November 1675, the head of the martyred Guru Teg Bahadur, brought by Bhai Jaita (renamed Bhai Jivan Singh according to Sikh rites), in defiance of the Mughal authorities, was cremated.

Photo Gallery

See also
 Golden temple
 Sikhism
 Gurdwara Rakab Ganj Sahib

References

External links

 Gurudwara Sis Ganj
 Gurudwara Sis Ganj at wikimapia

Religious buildings and structures completed in 1930
Gurdwaras in Delhi
History of Sikhism
1783 establishments in British India